Aeolosia is a genus of moths in the subfamily Arctiinae.

Species
 Aeolosia aroa
 Aeolosia atropunctata
 Aeolosia multipunctata

References
Natural History Museum Lepidoptera generic names catalog

Lithosiini
Moth genera